HD 66141 is a single star in the equatorial constellation of Canis Minor. It has the Bayer designation G Canis Minoris, the Gould designation 50 G. Canis Minoris, and has the HR 3145 identifier from the Bright Star Catalogue. When first catalogued it was in the Puppis constellation and was designated "13 Puppis", but it subsequently migrated to Canis Minor. Bode gave it the Bayer designation of Lambda Canis Minoris.

Properties
This star has an orange hue and is bright enough to be faintly visible to the naked eye on a dark night, having an apparent visual magnitude of +4.39. It is located at a distance of approximately 254 light years from the Sun based on parallax, and is drifting further away with a radial velocity of +71.6 km/s. The star is considered a member of the thin disk population. It has one known exoplanet companion.

The stellar classification of HD 66141 is K2IIIbFe-0.5:, which indicates an evolved K-type giant star with a mild underabundance of iron. It is an estimated nine billion years old with 0.98 times the mass of the Sun and has expanded to 21 times the Sun's radius. Over 2003 to 2012 a starspot was periodically dimming its light. The star is radiating 166 times the luminosity of the Sun from its photosphere at an effective temperature of 4,328 K.

A magnitude 10.32 visual companion was reported by J. Glaisher in 1842. As of 2015, it was located at an angular separation of  along a position angle of 315°.

Planetary system
From December 2003 to January 2012, the team B.-C. Lee, I. Han, and M.-G. Park observed "HD 66141" with "the fiber-fed Bohyunsan Observatory Echelle Spectrograph (BOES) at Bohyunsan Optical Astronomy Observatory (BOAO)".

In 2012, a long-period, wide-orbiting planet was deduced by radial velocity. This was published in November.

References

External links
 

K-type giants
Planetary systems with one confirmed planet
Canis Minor
Canis Minoris, G
Durchmusterung objects
Puppis, 13
Canis Minoris, 50
066141
039311
3145